"I Don't Believe in If Anymore" is a song by British singer-songwriter Roger Whittaker, released as a single in March 1970. It peaked at number 8 on the UK Singles Chart. After the success of "The Last Farewell" in 1975, the song was re-released.

Track listings 
7": Columbia / DB 8664 (1970)
 "I Don't Believe in If Anymore" – 3:18
 "Lullaby for My Love (Berceuse pour Mon Amour)" – 2:36

7": RCA Victor / 74-0355 (1970, US & Canada)
 "I Don't Believe in If Anymore" – 3:30
 "I Should Have Taken My Time" – 2:55

7": RCA Victor / PB-10356 (1975, US & Canada)
 "I Don't Believe in If Anymore" – 3:18
 "New World in the Morning" – 2:26

7": EMI / EMI-10898 (1975, Australia)
 "I Don't Believe in If Anymore" – 3:15
 "Emily" – 3:30

Charts

References 

1970 songs
1970 singles
Roger Whittaker songs
Columbia Records singles
RCA Victor singles